Mariusz Woźniak (4 March 1944 – 4 November 2020) was a Polish diplomat, ambassador to Indonesia (1991–1995), Jordan (1999–2003), and Ethiopia (2005–2007).

Life 
Woźniak graduated from English studies at the University of Warsaw. In 1981, he started his diplomatic career at the Ministry of Foreign Affairs as expert. He served at the embassies in Washington, D.C. (1981–1982), as First Secretary in Tokyo (1983–1987). Between 1991 and 1995, he represented Poland as ambassador to Indonesia. Next, from 1999 to 2003, he was ambassador to Jordan. Following his short stay at the diplomatic protocol in Warsaw, he ended his career as ambassador in Ethiopia (2005–2007).

Besides Polish, he was speaking English and Russian.

References 

1944 births
2020 deaths
Ambassadors of Poland to Ethiopia
Ambassadors of Poland to Indonesia
Ambassadors of Poland to Jordan
University of Warsaw alumni